Allée Claude Cahun–Marcel Moore is a street in Montparnasse in the 6th arrondissement of Paris, France.

History

It was named after French artists and Resistance fighters Claude Cahun and Marcel Moore.

The couple had its workshop and live Notre-Dame-des-Champs, close to the street.

This is the first street in the world named officially after a same-sex couple.

Access
Notre-Dame-des-Champs (Paris Métro) has access on the street, designed on a rambla style.

Places of interests 
 École des hautes études en sciences sociales
 Alliance française of Paris

References

External links

LGBT culture in Paris